Woodland Park School District Re-2 (WPSD) is a school district headquartered in Woodland Park, Colorado.

It originated from a two-story schoolhouse built in 1890. The Edlowe School District, the Eisweth School District, and two other school districts consolidated into Woodland Park School District in 1924. In Florissant School District and the Midland School District consolidated into Woodland Park schools after voters approved a school consolidation in a referendum in 1959.

Schools

References

External links
 
School districts in Colorado
Education in Teller County, Colorado
1890 establishments in Colorado
School districts established in 1890